The Johnson County School District is a public school district located in Johnson County, Kentucky. The district operates nine schools and has a total enrollment of 3,701. The Johnson County Board of Education is located in Paintsville.

Administration

Board of Education

Thom Cochran, Superintendent
Bob Hutchison, Chairman 
Brad Frisby, Member
Melvin Vanhoose, Vice Chairman 
William Fraley, Member 
Bruce Aaron Davis, Member
Valarie Blair, Board Secretary 
Misty Goble, Treasurer

Elementary schools

Central Elementary School - Paintsville
Flat Gap Elementary School - Flat Gap
Highland Elementary School - Staffordsville
Porter Elementary School - Hager Hill
W.R. Castle Memorial Elementary School

Middle schools
 Johnson County Middle School - Paintsville

High schools
Johnson Central High School - Paintsville

Alternative schools
Johnson County Alternative School - Paintsville

References

Education in Johnson County, Kentucky
School districts in Kentucky
School districts established in 1873
1873 establishments in Kentucky